Michael or Mike Phelan may refer to:
 Michael Francis Phelan (1875–1941), Member of the United States House of Representatives from Massachusetts
 Michael L. Phelan (born 1947), judge of the Federal Court of Canada
 Mike Phelan (born 1962), English football player
 Michael Phelan (billiards player) (1819–1871), Irish-born billiards star
 Michael Phelan (hurler) (born 1967), Irish hurler and manager
 Michael Phelan (police officer), Chief Police Officer, Australian Capital Territory Police
 Michael Phelan (Gaelic footballer) (born 1982), Irish Gaelic footballer
 Michael Phelan, writer-director of the 2005 film Into the Fire